Joseph Leon Pace (May 5, 1917 - May 21, 2000) was an American physician and politician who served as the Mayor of San Jose, California from 1964 to 1965 and on its City Council before and after his term as mayor from 1963 to 1967.

Pace was born in Salt Lake City and attended Brigham Young University, the University of Chicago School of Medicine, and the School of Aviation Medicine. Shortly after graduation, he joined the United States Navy and served as a flight surgeon during World War II in the South Pacific on the USS Monterey.

Upon discharge from military service, he relocated to San Jose, California, where he established a medical practice. From 1963-1967 he was a Councilmember for the city and held the title of Mayor from 1964-1965. He was the last Mayor to have the title as a ceremonial title, as Mayors following him were all elected at large. Following an unsuccessful re-election for City Council campaigns as a Republican for State Controller and Congress he suspended further political campaigning. As an active member of The Church of Jesus Christ of Latter-day Saints, he worked on numerous humanitarian relief medical missions on several continents throughout his later years.

References 

Mayors of San Jose, California
San Jose City Council members
1917 births
2000 deaths
United States Navy personnel of World War II
Brigham Young University alumni
Pritzker School of Medicine alumni
California Republicans